John E. Davis (born John Edward Davis; April 18, 1913 – May 12, 1990) was an American politician who served as Director of the Defense Civil Preparedness Agency from 1969 to 1976. He also previously served as the National Commander of The American Legion, from 1966 to 1967, and as the 25th Governor of North Dakota from 1957 to 1961.

Early life 
Davis was born in Goodrich, North Dakota. After attending several years of high school in Fargo, he graduated from Bismarck High School in 1931. Later that fall, he enrolled at the University of North Dakota in Grand Forks. While at the University, he pledged for Beta Theta Pi, and was active in the Reserve Officers' Training Corps (ROTC). He was the ranking officer in Scabbard and Blade, an organization of select senior ROTC cadet officers. Davis graduated with a Bachelor of Science in Commerce in 1935. He returned to Goodrich and took over management of his family's ranch and farm. Davis was married to Pauline Huntley in 1938, and they had three children; John Jr., Richard, and Kathleen. The couple divorced after forty years of marriage in 1978, after which he married Marilyn R. Westlie in 1980.

World War II 
In May 1941, Davis was ordered to active duty and reported first to Fort Snelling, Minnesota, before being sent to Camp Joseph T. Robinson, Arkansas, where he became commander of Company C, 1st Battalion, 134th Infantry, 35th Infantry Division. He saw extensive combat duty in the European Theater as commander of Company C, and later as the commander of the 1st Battalion, 134th Infantry Regiment, and received the Silver Star Medal, the Bronze Star Medal, and the Purple Heart. He was discharged from the United States Army on July 31, 1945, at Camp McCoy, Wisconsin.

Political career 
In 1946, Davis was elected mayor of McClusky, North Dakota, serving until 1952. That year, he successfully ran for a position in the North Dakota State Senate. He served in the Senate until 1956, when he was nominated for Governor on the Republican ticket. He defeated the Democratic candidate, Wally Warner, in the fall election. He was re-elected in 1958, defeating the Democratic candidate, John F. Lord, and served until 1960. He was a candidate for the United States Senate in 1960, but was narrowly defeated by Quentin N. Burdick. He was again a candidate in 1964, but lost the Republican primary to Tom Kleppe. In 1966, Davis was honored with the Sioux Award, the University of North Dakota Alumni Association's highest honor. Davis was elected The American Legion National Commander from 1966 to 1967, and was appointed Director of the Office of Civil Defense by President Richard Nixon in 1969. The agency was renamed in 1972 as the Defense Civil Preparedness Agency. Following his retirement in 1976, he was awarded the Department of Defense Service Medal.

Later life 
In 1977, Davis returned to North Dakota to operate the family ranch and resume presidency of the First National Bank of McClusky. In 1978, he received the Greater North Dakota Award from the Greater North Dakota Association. Davis was active in many non-profit organizations, including the Elks, Masons, and the Scottish Rite and the Shrine. He died on May 12, 1990, in Rancho Mirage, California. He is buried in Fairview Cemetery, Bismarck, North Dakota.

See also 

North Dakota's United States Senate special election, 1960

References

Further reading 
"'It Was Easy to Get Involved': An Interview with Governor John E. Davis." Edited by Gerald G. Newborg. Gerald G. Newborg. North Dakota History.v70, n1 (2003): 2–25.

External links 

John E. Davis at the National Governors Association
John E. Davis Papers at the University of North Dakota

1913 births
1990 deaths
20th-century American politicians
American Lutherans
Burials in North Dakota
Republican Party governors of North Dakota
National Commanders of the American Legion
Republican Party North Dakota state senators
Mayors of places in North Dakota
Recipients of the Silver Star
University of North Dakota alumni
People from Sheridan County, North Dakota
20th-century Lutherans
United States Army personnel of World War II
United States Army colonels